The Astana International Financial Centre (AIFC) is a financial hub in Astana, Kazakhstan that officially launched on July 5, 2018.

On 20 May 2015, the President of Republic of Kazakhstan Nursultan Nazarbayev announced the “100 Concrete Steps” Plan of the Nation to implement the five institutional reforms, designed to provide a strong national platform needed to achieve country's ambition of joining the top 30 developed countries by 2050. As part of the Plan of the Nation, the AIFC was established with a special legal status to be based on the EXPO-2017 International Specialized Exhibition infrastructure.

The Constitutional Statute "On the Astana International Financial Centre" approved on 7 December 2015 provides a legal framework for the functioning of the AIFC as well as a favourable environment for its participants.

The Astana International Financial Centre plays one of the main roles in attracting financial resources. It is positioned as a financial hub for the countries of Central Asia, the Caucasus, Eurasian Economic Union (EAEU), Middle East, Western China, Mongolia and Europe.

As of 2022, the number of enterprises working with the AIFC increased to 1046 companies from more than 35 countries. These companies include financial institutions such as the China Construction Bank, China Development Bank and CICC (Hong Kong) and Wood & Co (Czech Republic), the largest investment banks. According to the AIFC Chairman, by the end of 2020, the number is projected to increase to 500.

The number of companies working with the AIFC reached 500 in June 2020. The companies are from 35 countries. In the first half of 2020, the AIFC registered 122 new companies. Remarkably, 70 of them were registered during the lockdown caused by COVID-19 pandemic.

AIFC bodies

AIFC Management Council 
It is a supreme authority that includes high-profile leaders of global financial corporations and is chaired by the President of Kazakhstan. The main objectives of the Management Council include the determination of the strategic directions for the AIFC development and the assistance in the development of the favourable conditions for the formation of a leading financial centre. AIFC Development strategy was determined by the Management Council during its first meeting on 26 May 2016.

AIFC Authority 
The AIFC Authority was established on 28 December 2015 and is responsible for the development of the overall strategic plan, promotion of the AIFC in the global markets, attraction of the potential participants to the AIFC.

Astana International Exchange (AIX) 
The Astana International Exchange (AIX) was established in 2017 as part of the AIFC. develop the public equity and debt capital markets in Kazakhstan and Central Asian region. AIX was created to develop the public equity and debt capital markets in Kazakhstan and Central Asian region. AIX is regulated by the Astana Financial Services Authority, an independent regulator established within the AIFC. AIX shareholders include the AIFC, Goldman Sachs GS, the Shanghai stock exchange, and China's Silk Road Fund. Nasdaq NDAQ is behind the AIX trading platform.

Astana Financial Services Authority (AFSA)

FinTech Lab 
As part of developing its FinTech pillar, AIFC supports innovative companies through acceleration, incubation, mentoring programs and flexible regulation suitable for both start-up and incumbent FinTech firms. 
For these purposes in May 2017, AFSA has introduced the first regulatory sandbox regime in the region called the “FinTech Lab”, which enables firms to test new products and services in a safe environment without being immediately subject to standard regulatory requirements and allows AFSA to adopt regulatory approaches to keep up with innovation and build legislative frameworks tailored to the market needs. 
As of August 2020, the FinTech Lab has received more than 120 inquiries for testing and has supported 23 FinTech firms offering services in the field of digital banking, payments, operations with digital assets, crowdfunding, robo-advisory and other.

26 firms from 11 states were accepted to the Fintech Lab, focused on different types of financial services such as payments, mobile banking, digital assets, crowdfunding and other solutions. In two years, AIFC Fintech Hub's accelerator programs supported more than 120 startups.

AIFC International Arbitration Centre 
The International Arbitration Centre shall review disputes which the parties have agreed shall be settled by arbitration. It is planned to be launched in 2018. The opening ceremony of the AIFC International Arbitration Centre (IAC) was held in July 2019 during the Astana Finance Days conference in Astana (then known as Nur-Sultan).

AIFC Bureau for Continuing Professionals Development
AIFC Bureau for Continuing Professional Development is responsible for human capital development and plans to retrain over 2000+ specialists in the financial industry of Kazakhstan and, ultimately, creating critical mass of professionals for AIFC eco-system and beyond. In addition, the Bureau is responsible for investment and financial literacy programs related to AIFC's core pillars including Islamic Finance, Fintech, Capital Markets, Green Finance, as well as Asset and Wealth Management.

Language 
English is the official language on the AIFC territory.

Priority Sectors

Finance
It is the goal that the AIFC become a regional financial centre and be a top 20 leading Asian financial centres within 10 years.

Equities Trading
The AIFC has partnered with NASDAQ and the Shanghai Stock Exchange. The AIFC is the shareholder of the Astana International Exchange (AIX) that was established in 2017. AIX's first trading session was held on November 14, 2018, coinciding with the 25th anniversary of tenge, the national currency of Kazakhstan. The session was opened by Kazakh President Nursultan Nazarbayev.

Green Technology
The center uses renewable energy. The AIFC provides structural framework for the advancement of green finance. To that end, the centre launched the AIFC Green Finance Centre to develop and promote green finance in Kazakhstan and neighboring countries.

Information Technology
The AIFC supports the development of information technologies in Kazakhstan. An important organization that helps achieve this is Astana Hub. Even though it is independent from the AIFC, it has shared functions in the tech field.

Astana Hub - International IT and startup hub is a business incubator in Kazakhstan that provides support for new and start-up IT projects. The Astana Hub was launched on November 6, 2018 in the Kazakh capital by President of Kazakhstan Nursultan Nazarabyev.

On May 12, 2020, the AIFC established the Advisory Council on the Development of Legal Technology, which comprises experts from the UK, US, Netherlands, Kazakhstan, Russia, China, Singapore, and Switzerland. The main goal of the council is to create a vibrant and sustainable legal technology ecosystem that can improve the efficiency and quality of legal services and make them more accessible.

Partnerships
The AIFC signed an agreement with London-based global communications company OneWeb in January 2020 to accelerate broadband connectivity in Kazakhstan.
The partnership was established as part of the Digital Kazakhstan program to promote digitization in the country. The agreement stipulated that OneWeb would engage local telecom operators among its distribution partners to provide universal, high-speed, fibre-like broadband connectivity across the private and public sector, including businesses, schools, hospitals and civil services.

Other initiatives
The AIFC creates competence centres at Kazakhstan's major universities to improve investment literacy and help students develop skills in finance, investment and other industries. Eight platforms have already been established at Almaty universities.

Other Information 
Kazakh President Kassym-Jomart Tokayev and Kyrgyz President Sadyr Japarov visited the Astana International Financial Centre (AIFC) in March 2021. During the visit, Tokayev and Japrov were briefed on activities of different agencies in the AIFC and also attended a presentation of the e-Justice electronic filing system.

References

External links 
https://aifc.kz/ 
http://aifc.edu.kz/

Companies based in Astana
Economy of Kazakhstan
Financial services companies of Kazakhstan